The Return is a 2003 Russian coming-of-age drama film directed by Andrey Zvyagintsev and released internationally in 2004.

It tells the story of two Russian boys whose father suddenly returns home after a 12-year absence. He takes the boys on a holiday to a remote island on a lake that turns into a test of manhood of almost mythic proportions. It won the Golden Lion at the Venice Film Festival (as well as the award for the best first film). It received generally positive reviews from critics.

In a 2016 BBC critics' poll, The Return was ranked the 80th-greatest film of the 21st century.

Plot
In contemporary Russia, Ivan and his older brother Andrei have grown a deep attachment to each other to make up for their fatherless childhood. Both their mother and grandmother live with them. After running home after a fight with each other, the boys are shocked to discover their father has returned after a 12-year absence. With their mother's uneasy blessing, Ivan and Andrei set out on what they believe will be a simple fishing vacation with him.

Andrei is delighted to be reunited with their father and Ivan is apprehensive towards the man whom they know only from a faded photograph.

At first, both brothers are pleased with the prospect of an exciting adventure, but they soon strain under the weight of their father's awkward and increasingly brutal efforts to make up for the missing decade. Ivan and Andrei find themselves alternately tested, rescued, scolded, mentored, scrutinized, and ignored by the man. Andrei seems to look up to his father while Ivan remains stubbornly defensive.

As the truck stops and cafés give way to rain-swept, primeval wilderness coastline, Ivan's doubts give way to open defiance. Andrei's powerful need to bond with a father he's never known begins, in turn, to distance him from Ivan. Ivan and his father's test of will escalates into bitter hostility and sudden violence after the trio arrives at their mysterious island destination.

Ivan has an outburst of anger after witnessing his father strike Andrei. He shouts at his father, runs into the forest, and climbs to the top of the observatory tower. Andrei and their father run after him. The father tries to reason with Ivan, but this only stresses Ivan further. He then threatens to jump down from the top of the tower. The father tries to reach out to him, but falls to his death.

Ivan and Andrei take the body across the forest, bring him on board the boat, and row back to where they came. While the boys are putting their gear in the car, the boat starts to drift away. Andrei screams, "Father!" and starts running towards the shore, followed by Ivan, but it is too late. The boat and the body are sinking. Ivan screams "Father!" for the first and the last time from the bottom of his heart. They get into the car and drive away. The film ends with photographs from their journey; since the father does not appear on any of them, there is no proof that Andrei and Ivan went on a trip with him.

Cast
 Vladimir Garin as Andrei 
 Ivan Dobronravov as Ivan (Vanya)
 Konstantin Lavronenko as Father
 Natalia Vdovina as Mother

Production
The Return was filmed on and around Lake Ladoga and the Gulf of Finland. The budget of the film remains a secret, though in an interview the director and the producer hinted that it was well below $500,000. The director also mentioned that the producers made their money back even before it was screened at the Venice Film Festival. The film premiered in Russia on 16 October 2003, with the worldwide premiere taking place on 31 October 2003.

Vladimir Garin drowned shortly after filming and two months before the film's debut. He was 16 years old.

Reception
As of 20 September 2020, The Return has an approval rating of 96% on review aggregator website Rotten Tomatoes, based on 89 reviews, and an average rating of 8.05/10. The website's critical consensus states, "A suspenseful but perplexing thriller". It also has a score of 82 out of 100 on Metacritic, based on 30 critics, indicating "universal acclaim".

It grossed $4,429,093 worldwide.

Awards and nominations

International
BBC Four World Cinema Awards 2005
 Winner, BBC Four World Cinema Award

European Film Awards
 Winner, European Discovery of the Year (Fassbinder Award)

Golden Globe Awards
 Nominee, Best Foreign Language Film Russia

Palm Springs International Film Festival
 Winner, Best Foreign Film

Venice Film Festival
 Winner, Golden Lion
 Winner, Best First Film

Guldbagge Awards
 Winner, Best Foreign Film

César Awards
 Nominee, Best Foreign Film

Russian
Russian Guild of Film Critics
 Winner, Best Film
 Winner, Best Director of Photography (Mikhail Krichman)
 Winner, Best Debut

Nika Award
 Winner, Best Film
 Winner, Best Director of Photography (Mikhail Krichman)

Golden Eagle Award
 Winner, Best Film
 Winner, Best Director of Photography (Mikhail Krichman)
 Winner, Best Sound (Andrei Khudyakov)

References

External links

Movie Trailer and Screenshots

2003 films
2000s coming-of-age drama films
Films directed by Andrey Zvyagintsev
European Film Awards winners (films)
Best Foreign Film Guldbagge Award winners
Golden Lion winners
Russian coming-of-age drama films
Russian drama road movies
Films set on islands
2000s survival films
Films about brothers
2000s Russian-language films